Hexagenia is a genus of mayfly in the family Ephemeridae, the common burrower mayflies.

Species
These eight species belong to the genus Hexagenia:
 Hexagenia albivitta (Walker, 1853) i c g
 Hexagenia atrocaudata McDunnough, 1924 i c g b
 Hexagenia bilineata (Say, 1824) i c g b
 Hexagenia callineura Banks, 1914 c g
 Hexagenia limbata (Serville, 1829) i c g b
 Hexagenia mexicana Eaton, 1885 i c g
 Hexagenia orlando Traver, 1931 i c g b
 Hexagenia rigida McDunnough, 1924 i c g b
Data sources: i = ITIS, c = Catalogue of Life, g = GBIF, b = Bugguide.net

General information
Hexagenia are commonly referred to as burrower mayflies as they create u-shaped tunnels in the aquatic substrate where they reside. This shape allows them to draw in water from the surrounding areas by undulating their body near the mouth of the tunnel. Hexagenia feed upon microscopic organisms suspended in the water column and thus draw in all the food and oxygen they require. Therefore, these burrowing mayflies are often found in shallow substrates of streams and lakes, specifically in areas of slow current.

Hexagenia is similar in size and appearance to Pentagenia. The main difference is the rounded frontal process adjacent to the mandibular tusks in Hexagenia. In Pentagenia, this frontal process comes to a point.

References

Mayfly genera